Swisslion Group (full legal name: Swisslion Group d.o.o.) is a Serbian multinational food and drinks manufacturer headquartered in Novi Sad. Its products are produced in its factories located in Croatia, North Macedonia, Serbia and Bosnia and Herzegovina.

Swisslion Group core activities are the production of confectionery. This includes biscuits, chocolate bars, wafers, sweets, Turkish Delight, Eurocrem, pasta, soup, cereals, ready-made meals, baby food, marmalades and jams, fruit juices, syrups, alcoholic drinks and ice creams. Swisslion Group also manufactures private labels for companies internationally.

Swisslion Group well-known products include Eurocrem, Juvitana (baby food), Eurodessert (chocolates) and Viljamovka (pear brandy).

History
Swisslion Group traces its origins from the Takovo, founded in 1962 in Gornji Milanovac and Swisslion itself was founded in 1991. Takovo was state-owned during SFR Yugoslavia and one of the country's biggest industrial companies. Swisslion and Takovo merged in 2004 under the name of Swisslion Takovo, following Swisslion's acquisition of Takovo through a public tender.

Since then, Swisslion Takovo's main factories in Serbia are located in Vršac and Gornji Milanovac. The factory in Vršac primarily produces confectionery. Facilities in Gornji Milanovac spanning on over 30,000 square meters, produce ready-made meals,⁣ pasta, soups and fruit juices.

2008–2012
In 2008, Swisslion Group acquired the Croatian Euro Food Markt company based in Sisak, to reinforce its position in the Croatian market. The deal was reported to be worth €20 million.

On January 18, 2010, it was reported that a new confectionery factory in Trebinje worth €18 million had been inaugurated. Late in 2010, local media reported that further investment in the factory was planned. In early 2011, Swisslion Takovo announced that it was investing 5 million euros in new production lines for confectionery products in its factory in Trebinje.

2012–2017
In North Macedonia, production sites are located in Resen and Skopje. In March 2012, Swisslion Takovo announced that it had opened a new production unit in the town of Resen.

In 2012, local media reported that the production of "Jaffa cakes" would be moved from Swisslion's factory in Sisak (Croatia) to its factory in Trebinje (Bosnia and Herzegovina). Swisslion Takovo confirmed that it would be shifting the production of "Jaffa" cakes to Trebinje but that it would not be leaving Croatia as its factory in Sisak would continue production of other product.

2017–present
In February 2017, Swisslion Group bought wine company "Vršački vinogadi" for a sum of 4.6 million euros. In March 2017, Swisslion Group made a decision to donate "Swisslion industrija alata" company to the Government of Republika Srpska, due to accumulated tax debts. Since then, the ownership of the company remained unclear due to dispute between the company and the Government of Republika Srpska.

Former subsidiaries
This is a list of the Swisslion Group former official subsidiaries in Serbia and region (as of January 2018):
 Takovo d.o.o. Gornji Milanovac
 Swisslion Miloduh a.d. Kragujevac
 Kondivik Usluge d.o.o. Vršac
 Swisslion d.o.o. Beograd
 Banat 1894 d.o.o. Vršac
 Vršački vinogradi d.o.o. Vršac

Also, other subsidiaries of the Swisslion Group were:
 Prehrambena industrija Swisslion d.o.o. Skopje, North Macedonia
 Swisslion Mak d.o.o. Skopje, North Macedonia
 Swisslion Agroplod d.o.o. Resen, North Macedonia
 Swisslion Agrar d.o.o. Resen, North Macedonia
 Swisslion d.o.o. Sisak, Sisak, Croatia

See also 
 List of bean-to-bar chocolate manufacturers
 List of food companies

References

External links 
 
 Swisslion's Official Croatian website
 Swisslion's Official Macedonian website (in English)

Companies based in Novi Sad
D.o.o. companies in Serbia
Food and drink companies established in 1991
Food and drink companies of Serbia
Serbian brands
Serbian chocolate companies
Serbian companies established in 1991